The 1934 Clemson Tigers football team was an American football team that represented Clemson College in the Southern Conference during the 1934 college football season. In their fourth season under head coach Jess Neely, the Tigers compiled a 5–4 record (2–2 against conference opponents), finished fifth in the conference, and outscored opponents by a total of 89 to 85.

Henry Woodward was the team captain. Five Clemson players were selected as first-team players on the 1934 All-Southern Conference football team: end Stanley Fellers; tackles Tom Brown and Manuel Black; guard Henry Shore; and back Randy Hinson.

Schedule

References

Clemson
Clemson Tigers football seasons
Clemson Tigers football